"Just So You Know" is the first single from the album The War of Art by the alternative metal band American Head Charge. The single contains several remixes of "Just So You Know", and one unreleased track "Real Life". The CD includes the "Just So You Know" music video, audio clips from "The War of Art", Chad Hanks missive, and American Head Charge wallpapers. It was the last participation of Wayne Kile on guitar, who was replaced by Bryan Ottoson, who appears in the music video. Shawn "Clown" Crahan did one remix on the single.

Track list

Personnel
Martin Cock – vocals
Chad Hanks – bass, guitar, programming
Justin Fowler – keyboards, sampling
David Rogers – guitar
Wayne Kile – guitar, vocals
Aaron Zilch – keyboards, electronics
Chris Emery – drums
Bryan Ottoson – guitar (on "Real Life" and "Just So You Know" video)

Production
Rick Rubin – producer
Billy Bowers – editing
Lindsay Chase – project coordinator
Rich Costey – remixing, mixing
Greg Fidelman – engineer
Dean Karr – photography
Steve Mixdorf – engineer
Marc Moreau – editing
Jeremy Parker – assistant engineer
Gary Richards – manager
Eddy Schreyer – mastering
Justin Smith – mixing, remix assistant
Clown – remix

References 
Official "Just So You Know (Single)" album information on the American Head Charge official site
All Music Guide (4/5) link

2002 singles
Song recordings produced by Rick Rubin
American Head Charge songs
2001 songs
American Recordings (record label) singles